Epilobium roseum is a species of flowering plant belonging to the family Onagraceae.

Its native range is Europe to China. .

References

roseum